Island is a 2023 Czech adventure romantic comedy film directed by Rudolf Havlík and starring Jiří Langmajer and Jana Plodková.  Filming took place at the end of 2021 in Thailand. The first trailer for the film was released on November 11, 2022. It is inspired by Six Days, Seven Nights. The film premiered on 2 February 2023.

Plot
The protagonists of the film are Richard and Alice a married couple that goes on a vacation to a tropical resort. Richard announces to Alice that he wants to divorce her. When their flight crashes after a hasty trip back and they find themselves on a deserted island, they are forced to work together and forget their differences.

Cast
Jiří Langmajer as Richard
Jana Plodková as Alice
Ted Otis as Jimmy Holiday

References

External links
 
 Island at CSFD.cz 

2023 films
Czech adventure comedy films
Czech romantic comedy films
2020s Czech-language films
Films shot in Thailand